Dammer may refer to:
 Carl Lebrecht Udo Dammer (1860–1920), a German botanist
 Ober Dammer, the German name for Dąbrowa_Górna,_Lower_Silesian_Voivodeship, a village in the administrative district of Gmina Lubin, within Lubin County, Lower Silesian Voivodeship, in south-western Poland
 Dammer, the German name for Dąbrowa, a village in Namysłów County, Opole Voivodeship, in south-western Poland

See also
 Dammers (disambiguation)
 Dahmer (disambiguation)